Paint Rock Bluff was once a major navigational landmark for riverboaters on the Upper Mississippi River. It is located in Allamakee County, Iowa. It is noted for Native-American petroglyphs and paintings; these have been badly damaged by the elements and by vandalism. As a hydronym, it gives its name to Paint Creek.

The nearest town is Waukon Junction, Iowa.

External links
River Roads site
Iowa State Park site
National Park Service site

Landforms of Allamakee County, Iowa
Mississippi River
Landforms of Iowa
Cliffs of the United States